Maritimum  may refer to:

 Alyssum maritimum, a synonym for Lobularia maritima, the sweet alyssum or sweet alison
 Crithmum maritimum, the samphire or rock samphire, the sole species of the genus Crithmum, an edible wild plant
 Pancratium maritimum, the sea daffodil, a species native to the Mediterranean region and south-western Europe

See also
 Maritima (disambiguation)
 Maritime (disambiguation)
 Maritimus (disambiguation)